My Guys is an American sitcom. It aired on CBS on Wednesday nights for four weeks from April 3, 1996 to April 26, 1996.

Premise
The series centered on Sonny DeMarco, a widower who ran a limousine company, and who was raising two sons on Manhattan's Upper West Side.

Cast
Michael Rispoli as Sonny DeMarco
Mike Damus as Michael DeMarco
Francis Capra as Francis DeMarco
Marisol Nichols as Angela
Sherie Scott as Dori
Peter Dobson as Harvey

Episodes

References

External links

 LA Times review

1990s American sitcoms
1996 American television series debuts
1996 American television series endings
CBS original programming
English-language television shows
Television series by Warner Bros. Television Studios
Television shows set in New York City